Farz is a 1967 Hindi-language spy thriller film, produced by Sunderlal Nahata Dundi under the Vijaya Lakhshmi Pictures banner and directed by Ravikant Nagaich. Starring Jeetendra, Babita  and music composed by Laxmikant Pyarelal. The film is a remake of the Telugu film Gudachari 116 (1966) and is hugely inspired by James Bond Movies. The movie had two sequels, Keemat starring Dharmendra and Raksha starring Jeetendra again.

Plot
Secret Agent 116  named Gopal has been assigned the case of homicide of a fellow secret agent (303) by the head of CID, who (303) found evidence that can help identify the perpetrators. During this investigation, Gopal meets lovely Sunita, and both end up falling in love with each other. The traitor responsible for the killing of Agent 303 has gone to meet 303's sister Kamla and tells her that he is a CID inspector and investigating his brother's case, warning that her brother's killer may attempt on her pretending as his colleague and friend. He elsewhere unsuccessfully continued on the life of agent 116. 116 goes to meet Kamla and sees 303's portrait and notes down the studio photographer's name, but Kamla is convinced that 116 is the killer of her brother. Kamla is approached by another mafia don, Damodar, for her help in eliminating 116, to which she agrees. Damodar turns out to be Sunita's father when Sunita introduces him, Gopal gets suspicious about him and commences a background check, which reveals that her father is a gangster. As he sets out his case against Damodar, he continues his romance with Sunita. During Sunita's birthday party, Damodar directs his henchman to kill 116, which 116 escapes after some car chase. 116 hesitantly reveals to Sunita that her father is a gangster. Heartbroken Sunita confronts her father, who tells her that he was forced into his life of crime and terrorism, and some other person controls them all, overheard by 116 and his assistant who are hiding outside. 116 goes out for his search for the real culprit to a skyscraper apartment where Kamla was plotted. Kamla seductively dances and mix some intoxicant pill in his drink which overlooked by 116, and acted as drunk and eventually senseless. Goons take him to their secret den in city outskirts, along with Sunita, who mistakes them as Hospital Ward boys. In the den, 116 captures one of the goon leaders and forced him to reveal some information. 116 fights his way with Sunita and escapes in a vehicle. In the meantime, CID agents trace a letter leading to clues regarding the Chinese conspiracy to destabilize the nation and accommodated by traitors inside, led by a person wearing a Mao uniform named Supremo, who only speaks a few broken English sentences. The rest of the movie follows the 116's efforts to thwart a foreign conspiracy against India.

Cast
 Jeetendra as Gopal Kishan Pandey/Agent 116
 Babita as Sunita 
 Sajjan as Damodar
 Agha as Shantaram
 Rajanala Kaleswara Rao as Supremo
 Nagesh 
 Mohan Choti as Nikku
 Manohar Deepak as Raju
 Mukri as Raju
 Kanchana as Kamala
 Aruna Irani as Basanti
 David Abraham Cheulkar as Chief of Secret service

Soundtrack
The soundtrack was composed by Laxmikant Pyarelal and lyrics are by Anand Bakshi.

References

External links
 

1967 films
1960s Hindi-language films
1960s Urdu-language films
Films about intelligence agencies
Films scored by Laxmikant–Pyarelal
Hindi remakes of Telugu films
Indian spy thriller films
1960s spy thriller films
Films directed by Ravikant Nagaich
Urdu-language Indian films